The Battle of the Gulf of Cádiz was a naval action which occurred on 7 August 1604, during the last days of the Anglo-Spanish War (1585–1604). The battle took place when a flotilla of two galleons commanded by Antonio de Oquendo engaged two English privateers who were plundering shipping lanes and villages around the Gulf of Cádiz. One of the English ships was captured and the other damaged. Oquendo's action off Cádiz is notable for having been fought just 21 days before the signing of the Treaty of London, which ended the protracted war between England and Spain.

Spanish squadron at Lisbon

In early 1604, 27-year-old Spanish officer Antonio de Oquendo was appointed commander of a two-galleon flotilla based at Lisbon by his superior, Luis Fajardo, Captain General of the Spanish Ocean Fleet. Antonio was the son of Miguel de Oquendo, a fleet commander who died in October 1588 when his ship foundered off Pasajes, while coming back from the ill-fated campaign of the Armada Invencible. The goal of Oquendo’s small unit was to fight the Dutch, English, and Moroccan privateers which threatened the shipping lanes along the western Atlantic coast of Spain and Portugal. The squadron was made of the flagship Delfín de Escocia and the slightly smaller Dobladilla.

In July 1604, sea-traders and inhabitants from villages on the coast of Portugal and Andalusia reported a series of looting raids and attacks on shipping carried out by two privateers. The privateer flagship was a 500-ton vessel while the smaller warship was described as a fusta. Oquendo’s squadron departed from Lisbon on 15 July in search of the enemy.

The engagement
The Spanish flotilla searched the waters around Cape St. Vincent, Cape Santa María, and Cádiz for more than 20 days, without results. On 7 August at dawn, however, they found the two ships in the Gulf of Cádiz, between them and the shore, identifying them as English. The larger privateer vessel suddenly approached and eventually grappled Oquendo’s flagship, and about 100 men boarded Delfín de Escocia. After two hours of fighting, Oquendo managed to beat back the attackers, with many dead and wounded on both sides.  The clash was fought almost entirely with blade weapons. Spanish reports claim that Oquendo’s men threw some of the English intruders overboard. The privateer tried to disengage and flee, but Oquendo led his crew to the assault, boarding the enemy ship and forcing the English commander to surrender. The other vessel, which had been badly battered by Dobladilla’s guns, fled at full sail and could not be stopped. The Spanish flagship was heavily damaged in the action, arriving at Cascais along with Dobladilla and their prey for repairs.

Aftermath

While the galleons and the captured ship remained at Cascais, Fajardo's rivals let out the rumor that the squadron had suffered a disaster. All the doubts were swept away when Oquendo arrived in Lisbon, where he was given a triumphal reception. Captain General Luis Fajardo and King Philip III sent letters of congratulation to him, marking the beginning of a notable naval career. Oquendo himself issued a list of prisoners and handed over the English commander to the authorities. He was also awarded the captured privateer as a prize. The sea lanes between Lisbon and Cádiz were cleared of hostile warships for a long time.

References

1604 in Europe
1604 in Portugal
1604 in the British Empire
1604 in the Spanish Empire
Conflicts in 1604
History of Cádiz
Naval battles of the Anglo-Spanish War (1585–1604)